"Desperately" is a song written by Jamie O'Hara and Kevin Welch, and recorded by American country music artist Don Williams.  It was released in August 1988 as the third single from the album Traces.  The song reached number 7 on the Billboard Hot Country Singles & Tracks chart.

Charts

Weekly charts

Year-end charts

References

1988 singles
1988 songs
Don Williams songs
Songs written by Jamie O'Hara (singer)
Songs written by Kevin Welch
Song recordings produced by Garth Fundis
Capitol Records Nashville singles